Douglas Elliman is an American real estate company.

Douglas Elliman employs more than 7,000 agents and has 113 offices in New York City and across the country. The company also has a number of subsidiaries related to real estate services such as Douglas Elliman Development Marketing, Douglas Elliman Property Management, DE Commercial and DE Title. The current president and CEO is Scott Durkin.

History and overview

Douglas Elliman was founded in 1911 as a basement store at 421 Madison Avenue in Manhattan. The company was sold to the Milstein family (Seymour Milstein and Paul Milstein) in 1989 and then again to Insignia Financial Group (now CB Richard Ellis). In 2003 Insignia sold Douglas Elliman to Montauk Battery Realty, an affiliate of Vector Group's New Valley LLC subsidiary. 

In 2012, the company dropped "Prudential" from its name, returning to its original 1911 name. It has a partnership with London-based Knight Frank LLP for residential business. Douglas Elliman affiliates include DE Property Management, DE Title and DE Capital Mortgage.

In December 2021 Douglas Elliman was spun off from Vector Group.

Regional branches

 Douglas Elliman New York covers the New York Metropolitan area, with 22 offices in New York City, 26 offices on Long Island, and six offices in Westchester (headquarters at 101 King Street, Chappaqua) and Connecticut (headquarters at 88 Field Point Road in Greenwich, Connecticut). The company produces research on the New York City real estate market that is used to measure real estate activity by media and other organizations. It is a member of the Real Estate Board of New York (REBNY).
 Douglas Elliman Florida has its headquarters at 1111 Lincoln Road in South Beach, Miami, one of five South Beach offices, with 14 other offices across the state. In September 2013, Douglas Elliman named Jay Phillip Parker, a Florida attorney and real estate entrepreneur, as CEO of the Florida brokerage.
 Douglas Elliman California opened its Beverly Hills headquarters in 2015, in a building designed by Patrick Tighe. In 2017, Douglas Elliman acquired Teles Properties, a Southern California competitor. When the acquisition is complete, the combined firm will be the second-largest non-franchise residential brokerage in California based on sales volume, after Pacific Union. Last year, Elliman and Teles had a combined sales volume of around $4 billion in California and $27.4 billion nationwide, according to Douglas Elliman. Following the acquisition, the Teles name will be dropped.
 Douglas Elliman Hamptons has headquarters at 2488 Main Street Bridgehampton, one of nine East End offices.

Notable brokers
Tal and Oren Alexander
Josh Altman
Penny Crone
Raphael De Niro
Fredrik Eklund
Luis D. Ortiz
Tracy Tutor

Philanthropy

Douglas Elliman's philanthropic donations include the American Heart Association, Central Park Conservancy, the Gold Coast Film Festival, and Big Brothers Big Sisters of New York City. In 2013, the company donated $100,000 to the Southampton Hospital Foundation.

References

External links
Douglas Elliman Real Estate official website
Douglas Elliman Florida South Florida subdivision
Douglas Elliman Property Management
DE Title
John Holusha, Douglas Elliman Real Estate Brokerage to Be Sold, New York Times, May 29, 1999

Real estate services companies of the United States
Real estate companies established in 1911
Companies based in New York City
American companies established in 1911